Alexander "Sawney" Bean was said to be the head of a 45-member clan in Scotland in the 16th century that murdered and cannibalized over 1,000 people in 25 years. According to legend, Bean and his clan members were eventually caught by a search party sent by King James VI and executed for their heinous crimes.

The story appeared in The Newgate Calendar, a crime catalog of Newgate Prison in London. The legend lacks sufficient evidence to be deemed true by historians, and there is debate as to why the legend would have been fictionalized; nevertheless, the myth of "Sawney" Bean has passed into local folklore and has become a part of the Edinburgh tourism circuit.

Legend
According to The Newgate Calendar, a London tabloid publication from the 18th and 19th centuries, Alexander Bean was born in East Lothian during the 16th century. His father was a ditch-digger and hedge-trimmer; Bean tried to take up the family trade but quickly realised that he was not fit for this work.

He left home with an allegedly vicious woman named Black Agnes Douglas, who apparently shared his inclinations and was accused of being a witch. After some robbing and the cannibalization of one of their victims, the couple ended up at a coastal cave in Bennane Head between Girvan and Ballantrae.

Sawney and Agnes produced six daughters, eight sons, 14 granddaughters, and 18 grandsons the grandchildren were products of incest between their children.

Lacking the inclination for regular labour, the Bean clan thrived by laying careful ambushes at night to rob and murder individuals or small groups. The clan brought the bodies back to their cave where the corpses were dismembered and eaten. They pickled the leftovers in barrels and discarded body parts, which would sometimes wash up on nearby beaches. This strategy was used to help conceal their crimes and lead villagers to believe that it was animals who were attacking travellers.

The body parts and disappearances did not go unnoticed by the local villagers, but the Bean clan stayed in their cave by day and took their victims at night. The Bean clan was so clandestine that the villagers were unaware of the murderers living nearby.

As local people began to take notice of the disappearances, several organized searches were launched to find the culprits. One search took note of the cave but the men refused to believe anything human could live in it. Frustrated and in a frenetic quest for justice, the townspeople hanged several innocents but the disappearances continued. Suspicion often fell on local innkeepers since they were the last known to have seen many of the missing people alive.

One night, the Bean clan ambushed a married couple riding from a fayre on one horse. The man was skilled in combat, so he deftly held off the clan with sword and pistol. However, the Bean clan unhorsed the wife, and she fell to the ground. The women in Bean’s group that night killed the wife, cutting her throat and sucking her blood; they also pulled out her intestines. Before they could take the resilient husband, a large group of fayre-goers appeared on the trail and the Beans fled. The fayre-goers took the survivor to the local magistrate, whom they informed of this experience.

With the Beans' existence finally revealed, it was not long before the King (perhaps James VI of Scotland in tales linked to the 16th century, though it is less clear who this could be in other tales from the 15th century) heard of the atrocities and decided to lead a search with a team of 400 men and several bloodhounds. They soon found the Bean clan's previously-overlooked cave in Bennane Head thanks to the bloodhounds. Upon entering the cave by torchlight, the searchers found the Bean clan surrounded by human remains: some body parts hanging from the wall, barrels filled with limbs, and piles of stolen heirlooms and jewelry.

There are two versions of the events following the Bean clan’s discovery. The most common of the two is that the Bean clan was captured alive where they gave up without a fight. They were taken in chains to the Tolbooth Jail in Edinburgh, then transferred to Leith or Glasgow where they were promptly executed without trial as people saw them as subhuman and unfit for one. Sawney and his fellow men had their genitalia cut off and thrown into the fires, their hands and feet severed, and were allowed to bleed to death, with Sawney shouting his dying words: "It isn't over, it will never be over". After watching the men die, Agnes, her fellow women, and the children were tied to stakes and burned alive. These execution practices recall, in essence if not in detail, the punishments of hanging, drawing and quartering decreed for men convicted of treason. In contrast, women convicted of the same were burned. There is also another claim that the search party placed gunpowder at the entrance of their cave, where the Sawney Bean clan faced the fate of suffocation.

The town of Girvan, located near the macabre scene of murder and debauchery, has another legend about the Bean clan. There are claims that one of Bean's daughters eventually left the clan and settled in Girvan where she planted a tree that became known as "The Hairy Tree". After her family's capture and exposure, the daughter's identity was revealed by angry locals who hanged her from the bough of the Hairy Tree.

Sources and veracity 
According to The Scotsman, there is a debate over the validity of the Sawney Bean tale. Some people believe that Sawney Bean was a real person, while others think he was just a mythical figure. Dorothy L. Sayers offered a gruesome account of the Sawney Bean tale in her anthology Great Short Stories of Detection, Mystery and Horror (Gollancz, 1928.)  The book was a best-seller in Britain, reprinted seven times in the next five years. A 2005 article by Sean Thomas notes that historical documents, such as newspapers and diaries during the era in which Sawney Bean was supposedly active, make no mention of ongoing disappearances of hundreds of people. Additionally, Thomas notes inconsistencies in the stories but speculates that kernels of truth might have inspired the legend. There are contradicting beliefs as to when the atrocities occurred. Thomas  explains that while many believe Sawney Bean's reign took place during the 1600s, others believe that it occurred centuries before. The author also makes a claim that it is likely that the legend was embellished and altered over time to become more relevant to readers, and provide more shock factor.

The Sawney Bean legend closely resembles the story of Christie-Cleek, which is attested much earlier in the early 15th century. Christie Cleek is a mythical Scottish cannibal who lived during a famine in the mid-fourteenth century.

The legend of Sawney Bean first appeared in the British chapbooks (rumour magazines of the day). Today, many argue that the story was a political propaganda tool to denigrate the Scots after the Jacobite rebellions.  Thomas disagrees, noting: "If the Sawney Bean story is to be read as deliberately anti-Scottish, how do we explain the equal emphasis on English criminals in the same publications?  Wouldn't such an approach rather blunt the point?".  (See also "Sawney" for this theory).

A broadside from circa 1750 mentions "the Scottish traditional story of Sandy Bane" as it relates to a report of a murderer who had been eating live cats.

Another cannibal story from Scotland, even more redolent of the Sawney Bean tale than the Christie Cleek story, can be found in the 1696 work of Nathaniel Crouch, a compiler and popular history writer who published under the pseudonym "Richard Burton". In this tale, the following happened in 1459, the year before James II of Scotland's death:"...about which time a certain thief who lived privately in a den, with his wife and children, were all burned alive, they having made it their practice for many years to kill young people and eat them; one girl only of a year old was saved, and brought up at Dundee, who at twelve years of age being found guilty of the same horrid crime, was condemned to the same punishment, and when the people followed her in great multitudes to execution, wondering at her unnatural villainy, she turned toward them, and with a cruel countenance said, "What do you thus rail at me, as if I had done such an heinous act, contrary to the nature of man? I tell you that if you did but know how pleasant the taste of man's flesh was, none of you all would forbear to eat it;" and thus with an impenitent and stubborn mind she suffered deserved death".

Hector Boece notes that the infant daughter of a Scottish brigand, who was executed with his family for cannibalism, though raised by foster parents, developed the cannibal appetite at 12, and was put to death for it. This was summarized by George M. Gould and Walter Pyle in Anomalies and Curiosities of Medicine.

Popular culture
 Wes Craven used Sawney Bean as the inspiration for his film The Hills Have Eyes.
 In the Japanese manga and anime series Attack on Titan, Hange Zoë recounts the tale of a cannibalistic clan to two captured Titans. They ended the tale by naming the two Titans “Sawney” and “Bean”.
The legend's influence can also be seen in the films Ravenous, Wrong Turn and The Texas Chain Saw Massacre.
 In the Image comics series Hack/Slash, the main character Vlad (a.k.a. "The Meatman Killer") is eventually revealed to be a descendant of Sawney Bean.
 The novel The Ballad of Sawney Bain (Polygon, 1990) by Harry Tait was a "kind of historiographic metafiction retelling of the tale of Sawney Bean".  In 1990 it was awarded the Saltire Society's award for Scottish First Book of the Year.
 The novel Off Season by the late horror novelist Jack Ketchum was inspired by the Sawney Bean tale.
 The film Sawney: Flesh of Man (2012) gives the story of Sawney Bean a contemporary setting.
 The film Judge Dredd (1995) introduces the Angel Gang, a family of cannibalistic scavenging cave dwellers
 The Rockstar-developed video game Red Dead Redemption 2 (2018) contains a family of savage and barbaric cave dwellers
 Death metal band Deeds of Flesh's 1998 album Inbreeding the Anthropophagi has its main lyrical concept based on the legend of Sawney Bean, his inbred, cave-dwelling family, and their grisly practice of attacking travelers on local roads for food and profit.
 Sawney Bean's tale is mentioned on the fantasy novella "The Monarch of the Glen", included on the anthology Fragile Things by british author Neil Gaiman. The story, set after the events of American Gods, sees the character Shadow travelling to Scotland.
 In the children's book "The Day I Swapped My Dad For Two Goldfish" by Neil Gaiman and Dave McKean, the two goldfish are named "Sawney" and "Beany".

References

External links 
 
BBC Scotland - The Grisly Deeds of Alexander Bean
The Complete Newgate Calendar (Sawney Bean(e))
Balcreuchan Cave and Sawney Bean

16th-century executions by Scotland
16th-century Scottish people
Carrick, Scotland
Executed Scottish people
Executed serial killers
Incest
Legendary Scottish people
Male serial killers
People executed by the Kingdom of Scotland by burning
People from East Lothian
Scottish cannibals
Scottish folklore
Scottish serial killers
Year of birth unknown
Newgate Prison